Happy Cactus was a band formed by Colin Meloy while he attended Helena High School.  Other members of Happy Cactus included David Casey, Deidre Casey, and Mark Schummer. The band's genre can be described as "alt-country," "indie," and "folk."   Former Band members cite R.E.M., The Replacements,  The Beatles and Uncle Tupelo as influences.

Discography
Cricket - 1993
Glass Flesh: A Tribute To Robyn Hitchcock performed by the voices and fingers of internet. - 1996
 Salvation - 3:19 (Meloy, Casey)
 Sunday - 2:04 (Meloy, Casey)
 How 'Bout? - 3:26 (Meloy, Casey)
 Halo of Eyes - 4:53 (Meloy, Casey)
 Step Behind - 3:04 (Casey, Casey, Meloy)
 Lose Again - 3:09 (Meloy, Casey, Casey, Schummer)
 Elizabeth - 2:21 (Meloy)
 Frigid Catfish - 2:05 (Casey)
 Blind - 3:32 (Casey, Casey, Meloy)
 Only For You - 5:42 (Meloy, Casey)
 Flying - 2:27 (Meloy)
 Mussolini Never Ate Ice Cream - 2:42 (Meloy)
 Say Goodbye  - 2:55 (Meloy)
 Fever - 4:18 (Casey, Casey, Meloy)

External links
 Short Description of the Happy Cactus years by David Casey

Musical groups from Montana